Fire Masters is a Canadian cooking competition television series that began airing simultaneously on Food Network Canada in Canada and Cooking Channel in the United States on July 6, 2019. The show is presented by chef Dylan Benoit, and it features three barbecue chefs competing in three rounds, where the winner of the second round wins a Napoleon portable barbecue grill and then competes against one of the three judges in the final round for a prize of $10,000.

Fire Masters was initially supposed to air for only one season; but a second season began airing on December 21, 2019.
As of August 2020 there have been three seasons of the show.

Episodes

Season 1 (2019)

Notes

References

External links
 
 

2010s Canadian cooking television series
2019 Canadian television series debuts
2020s Canadian cooking television series
Cooking Channel original programming
Cooking competitions in Canada
English-language television shows
Food Network (Canadian TV channel) original programming
Food reality television series